Sukha (Pali and ) means happiness, pleasure, ease, joy or bliss. Among the early scriptures, 'sukha' is set up as a contrast to 'preya' (प्रेय) meaning a transient pleasure, whereas the pleasure of 'sukha' has an authentic state happiness within a being that is lasting. In the Pāli Canon, the term is used in the context of describing laic pursuits and meditation.

Etymology
According to Monier-Williams (1964), the etymology of sukha is "said to be su ['good'] + kha ['aperture'] and to mean originally 'having a good axle-hole'"; thus, for instance, in the Rig Veda sukha denotes "running swiftly or easily" (applied, e.g., to chariots).  Monier-Williams also notes that the term might derive alternatively as "possibly a Prākrit form of su-stha, q.v.; c.f. duh̩kha", literally meaning su ['good'] + stha ['standing'].  Sukha is juxtaposed with dukha (Sanskrit; Pali: dukkha; often translated as "suffering"), which was established as the major motivating life principles in early Vedic religion. This theme of the centrality of dukkha was developed in later years in both Vedic and the offshoot Buddhist traditions. The elimination of dukkha is the raison d'être of early Buddhism.

Pali literature

In the Pali Canon and related literature, the term is used in a general sense to refer to "well-being and happiness" (hitasukha) in either this present life or future lives.  In addition, it is a technical term associated with describing a factor of meditative absorption (jhāna) and a sensory-derived feeling (vedanā).

General life pursuit
In the Pāli Canon, the Buddha discusses with different lay persons "well-being and happiness" (hitasukha) "visible in this present life" (diha-dhamma) and "pertaining to the future life" (samparāyika), as exemplified by the following suttas.

Anana Sutta
In the Anaa Sutta (AN 4.62), the Buddha describes four types of happiness for a "householder partaking of sensuality" (gihinā kāma-bhoginā):
 the happiness of earning (atthi-sukha) wealth by just and righteous means
 the happiness of using (bhoga-sukha) wealth liberally on family, friends, & on meritorious deeds
 the happiness of debtlessness (anaa-sukha) be free from debts
 the happiness of blamelessness (anavajja-sukha), to live a faultless and pure life without committing evil in thought, word, and deed
Of these, the wise (sumedhaso) know that the happiness of blamelessness is by far the greatest householder happiness.  Economic and material happiness is not worth one sixteenth part of the spiritual happiness arising out of a faultless and good life.

Kalama Sutta
In the Kālāmā Sutta (AN 3.65), townspeople ask the Buddha how they are to ascertain which spiritual teaching is true.  The Buddha counsels that one should "enter and dwell" (upasampajja vihareyyātha) in "things" or "qualities" (dhammā) that are:
 skillful (kusalā), 
 blameless (anavajjā), 
 praised by the wise (viññuppasatthā), and
 when put into practice, are conducive to well-being and happiness (samattā samādinnā hitāya sukhāya savattantī)
Using the latter criterion, the Buddha then asks the townspeople to assess greed (lobha), hate (dosa) and delusion (moha) whereby it is agreed that entering and dwelling in non-greed, non-hate and non-delusion lead to well-being and happiness.  The Buddha states that, given this understanding, a noble disciple (ariyasāvako) pervades all directions with lovingkindness, compassion, sympathetic joy and equanimity (see the four brahmaviharas); and, by doing so, one purifies oneself, avoids evil-induced consequences, lives a happy present life and, if there is a future karmic rebirth, one will be born in a heavenly world.

Dighajanu Sutta
In the Dighajānu Sutta (AN 8.54), Dighajānu approaches the Buddha and states:
"We are lay people enjoying sensuality; living crowded with spouses & children; using Kasi fabrics & sandalwood; wearing garlands, scents, & creams; handling gold & silver. May the Blessed One teach the Dhamma for those like us, for our happiness & well-being in this life, for our happiness & well-being in lives to come."
In a manner somewhat similar to his exposition in the aforementioned Anaa Sutta, the Buddha identifies four sources that lead to well-being and happiness in the current life:
 productive efforts (uhāna-sampadā) in one's livelihood,
 protective efforts (ārakkha-sampadā) regarding ones wealth in terms of possible theft or disaster,
 virtuous friendship (kalyāa-mittatā), and
 even-headed living (sama-jīvikatā), abstaining from womanizing, drunkenness, gambling and evil friendships. 
In terms of well-being and happiness in the next life, the Buddha identifies the following sources:
 faith (saddhā) in the fully enlightened Buddha;
 virtue (sīla), as exemplified by the Five Precepts;
 generosity (cāga), giving charity and alms; and,
 wisdom (paññā), having insight into the arising and passing of things.

Mettā practice
As indicated above, in the Kālāmā Sutta, the Buddha identifies the practice of the four divine abodes (brahmavihara) as being conducive to one's own well-being and happiness. The first of these abodes is mettā (benevolence, kindness) which is, for instance, classically expressed in the Pali canon's Karaniya Mettā Sutta ("Scripture of Compassionate Benevolence") (Sn 1.8) by the sincere wish (in English and Pali):

Similarly, the Pali commentaries (SN-A 128) explicitly define mettā as "the desire to bring about the well-being and happiness [of others]" (hita-sukha-upanaya-kāmatā)  Thus, in Buddhism, to dwell wishing for others' general happiness is conducive to the development of one's own happiness.

Feeling attribute
In the Buddhist frameworks of the five aggregates (Sanskrit: skandha; Pali: khandha) and dependent origination (Sanskrit: pratītyasamutpāda; Pali: paticcasamuppāda), "feelings" or "sensations" (vedanā) arise from the contact of an external object (such as a visual object or sound) with a sensory organ (such as the eye or ear) and consciousness.  In the Pali Canon, such feelings are generally described to be of one of three types: pleasant (sukha), unpleasant (dukkha), or neither-unpleasant-nor-pleasant (adukkha-asukha).

Mental factor in meditation

In the commentarial tradition on Buddhist meditation, the development of jhāna (Sanskrit: dhyāna) is described as the development of five mental factors (Sanskrit: caitasika; Pali: cetasika) that counteract the five hindrances:

 vitakka ("applied thought") counteracts sloth and torpor (lethargy and drowsiness)
 vicāra ("sustained thought") counteracts doubt (uncertainty)
 pīti (rapture) counteracts ill-will (malice)
 sukha (non-sensual pleasure") counteracts restlessness-worry (excitation and anxiety)
 ekaggata (one-pointedness) counteracts sensory desire

Both pīti and sukha are born of bodily seclusion and mental quietude in first jhāna, but both are then born of focused concentration (samādhi) in the second jhāna and only sukha is sustained in the third jhāna until it is abandoned for pure, mindful equanimity (upekkhāsatipārisuddhi) in the fourth jhāna.

The Visuddhimagga distinguishes between pīti and sukha in the following experiential manner:
And wherever the two are associated, happiness [here, Ñāamoli's translation of pīti] is the contentedness at getting a desirable object, and bliss [sukha] is the actual experiencing of it when got.  Where there is happiness [pīti] there is bliss (pleasure) [sukha]; but where there is bliss [sukha] there is not necessarily happiness [pīti].  Happiness is included in the formations aggregate; bliss is included in the feeling aggregate.  If a man exhausted in a desert saw or heard about a pond on the edge of a wood, he would have happiness; if he went into the wood's shade and used the water, he would have bliss....

Providing a bare-bones conditional chain of events that overlaps the above more narrative exposition, the Upanisa Sutta (SN 12.23) states that sukha arises from tranquillity (passaddhi) of the body and mind, and in turn gives rise to concentration (samādhi). Citing traditional post-canonical Pali literature related to this discourse, Bodhi (1980) adds the following functional definition of sukha:
The subcommentary to the Upanisa Sutta explains sukha as the happiness of the access to absorption. The term 'access' (upacara) denotes the stage in the cultivation of serenity immediately preceding full absorption, the intended goal of serenity meditation. Access is characterized by the abandonment of the five hindrances and the arising of the 'counterpart sign,' the self-luminous object of interior perception which is the focal point for the higher stages of concentration.

As a characterization of awakening
Nibbāna (Sanskrit: Nirvāṇa) entails the foundational extinction or "blowing out" of the processes of unwholesome desire, aversion, and delusion. From the perspective of awakened experience, the latter deleterious processes are appreciated as "agitations" of the mind. In comparative contrast to such agitation, sukha and its cognates are at places in the Pali Canon used to characterize the calm of Nibbāna, the "Unconditioned," as a bliss:

The born, come-to-be, produced, 
The made, the conditioned, the transient, 
Conjoined with decay and death, 
A nest of disease, perishable, 
Sprung from nutriment and craving's cord — 
That is not fit to take delight in.

The escape from that, the peaceful, 
Beyond reasoning, everlasting, 
The not-born, the unproduced, 
The sorrowless state that is void of stain, 
The cessation of states linked to suffering, 
The stilling of the conditioned — bliss.

Sanskrit literature
In the Yoga Sūtras, Patañjali uses the word 'sukha' when he defines asana as the balance between "Sukha" and "Stirah" (strength, steadiness, firmness).

Neuroscientific basis
Some researchers have proposed that a "shift" in the activity of the medial prefrontal cortex is what supports a state of inner fulfillment and equanimity.

See also
 
 Brahmavihara (divine abodes: lovingkindess, compassion, sympathetic joy, and equanimity)
 Dependent Origination
 Jhāna (absorption)
 Dukkha (suffering)
 Householder (Buddhism)
 Kilesa (defilements; such as greed, hate, and delusion)
 Pīti (Joy)
 Khandas (aggregates)
 Vedanā (feeling)

Notes

References

Further reading
 Amaravati Sangha (trans.) (1994, 2004). "Karaniya Metta Sutta: The Buddha's Words on Loving-Kindness" from Chanting Book: Morning and Evening Puja and Reflections (1994). Hemel Hempstead: Amaravati Publications. Retrieved 2008-05-10 from "Access to Insight" (2004) at Karaniya Metta Sutta: The Buddha's Words on Loving-Kindness.
 Bodhi, Bhikkhu (1980). Transcendental Dependent Arising: A Translation and Exposition of the Upanisa Sutta (Wheel No. 277/278). Kandy: Buddhist Publication Society. Retrieved 2008-05-08 from "Access to Insight" (1995) at Transcendental Dependent Arising: A Translation and Exposition of the Upanisa Sutta.
 Bodhi, Bhikkhu (2005). In the Buddha's Words: An Anthology of Discourses from the Pali Canon. Boston: Wisdom Publications. .
 Ñāamoli, Bhikkhu (trans.) (1999). The Path of Purification: Visuddhimagga. Seattle, WA: BPS Pariyatti Editions. .
 Monier-Williams, Monier (1899, 1964). A Sanskrit-English Dictionary. London: Oxford University Press. . Retrieved 2008-05-08 from "Cologne University" at MW Scan.
 Nyanaponika Thera (trans.) (1983). Datthabba Sutta: To Be Known (SN 36.5). Retrieved 2008-05-08 from "Access to Insight" at: Datthabba Sutta: To Be Known.
 Nyanatiloka Mahathera (1952, 1980). Buddhist Dictionary: Manual of Buddhist Terms and Doctrines. Kandy: Buddhist Publication Society. . Retrieved 2008-05-08 from "BuddhaSasana" at Nyanatiloka: Buddhist Dictionary.
 Rhys Davids, T.W. & William Stede (eds.) (1921-5). The Pali Text Society’s Pali–English Dictionary. Chipstead: Pali Text Society. Retrieved 2008-05-08 from "U. Chicago" at http://dsal.uchicago.edu/dictionaries/pali/.
 Thanissaro Bhikkhu (trans.) (1994). Kalama Sutta: To the Kalamas (AN 3.65). Retrieved 2008-05-08 from "Access to Insight" at Kalama Sutta: To the Kalamas.
 Thanissaro Bhikkhu (trans.) (1995). Dighajanu (Vyagghapajja) Sutta: To Dighajanu (AN 8.54). Retrieved 2008-05-08 from "Access to Insight" at Dighajanu (Vyagghapajja) Sutta: To Dighajanu.
 Thanissaro Bhikkhu (trans.) (1997a). Anana Sutta: Debtless (AN 4.62). Retrieved 2008-05-08 from "Access to Insight" at Anana Sutta: Debtless.
 Thanissaro Bhikkhu (trans.) (1997b). Samadhanga Sutta: The Factors of Concentration (AN 5.28). Retrieved 2008-05-09 from "Access to Insight" at Samadhanga Sutta: The Factors of Concentration.
 Thanissaro Bhikkhu (trans.) (1997c). Upanisa Sutta: Prerequisites (SN 12.23). Retrieved 2008-05-08 from "Access to Insight" at Upanisa Sutta: Prerequisites.
 Thanissaro Bhikkhu (trans.) (1998). Chachakka Sutta: The Six Sextets (MN 148). Retrieved 2008-05-08 from "Access to Insight" at Chachakka Sutta: The Six Sextets.
 Thanissaro Bhikkhu (trans.) (2006). Metta Sutta: Good Will (1) (AN 4.125). Retrieved 2008-05-10 from "Access to Insight" at Metta Sutta: Good Will (1).
 Walshe, Maurice O'Connell (1985). Upanisaa Sutta: Upanisaa (excerpt) (SN 12.23) from Samyutta Nikaya: An Anthology (Wheel No. 318-321). Kandy: Buddhist Publication Society.  Retrieved from "Access to Insight" (2007) at Upanisaa Sutta: Upanisaa.

External links

Mental factors in Buddhism